Elizabeth Curtis may refer to:

 Elizabeth Curtis, a character in King Solomon's Mines (1950 film)
 Elizabeth Curtis, U.S. National Dancesport Champion (1979–1985)
 Elizabeth Beers-Curtis (1847–1933), American–French heiress and aristocrat

See also
Betty Curtis (1936–2006), Italian singer